Alberto Blanco may refer to:

 Alberto Blanco (footballer) (born 1978), Panamanian footballer
 Alberto Blanco (poet) (born 1951), Mexican poet
 Alberto Blanco (weightlifter) (born 1950), Cuban weightlifter